The Men's long jump at the 2014 Commonwealth Games was part of the athletics programme. The two-day event was held at Hampden Park on 29 and 30 July 2014.

Qualifying round

Qualifying rule: qualification standard 7.90m (Q) or at least best 12 qualified (q).

Final round

References

Men's long jump
2014